The 2015 South American Youth Football Championship was an international association football tournament held in Uruguay. The ten national teams involved in the tournament were required to register a squad of 23 players; only players in these squads were eligible to take part in the tournament.

Each player had to have been born after 1 January 1995.

Players' names marked in bold have been capped at full international level.

Argentina
Coach: Humberto Grondona

Bolivia
Coach: Claudio Chacior

Brazil
Coach: Alexandre Gallo

Chile
Coach: Hugo Tocalli

Colombia
Coach: Carlos Restrepo

Ecuador
Coach: Sixto Vizuete

Paraguay
Coach: Víctor Genes

Peru
Coach: Víctor Rivera

Uruguay
Coach: Fabián Coito

Venezuela
Coach: Miguel Echenausi

References

External links
Official Squad list

South American U-20 Championship squads